Ismael Yacouba Garba (born 27 April 1993) is a Nigerien taekwondo practitioner.

In 2017, he competed in the men's featherweight event at the World Taekwondo Championships held in Muju, South Korea. At the 2018 African Taekwondo Championships held in Agadir, Morocco, he won the silver medal in the men's 68 kg event.

In 2019, he competed in the men's featherweight event at the World Taekwondo Championships held in Manchester, United Kingdom. In the same year, he represented Niger at the 2019 African Games held in Rabat, Morocco and he won the gold medal in the men's 68 kg event. In the final, he defeated Abdelrahman Wael of Egypt.

References

External links 
 

Living people
1993 births
Place of birth missing (living people)
Nigerien male taekwondo practitioners
African Taekwondo Championships medalists
African Games medalists in taekwondo
African Games gold medalists for Niger
Competitors at the 2019 African Games
20th-century Nigerien people
21st-century Nigerien people